Ben Gill, better known as Party Ben, is a DJ in San Francisco. He spent many years working at radio station Live 105 and producer of mashup music.

Mashups
From June 2003 to December 30, 2005, Party Ben hosted the "Sixx Mixx" on Live 105, a weekly program of mashups. After the "Sixx Mixx" ended, he aired mixes on KJEE-FM in Santa Barbara and 91X in San Diego. Party Ben was a member of the "Untitled Friday Night Show" along with Madden and Miles the Intern on Live 105. In 2008 Party Ben started collaborating with Slacker Radio, an internet radio service, to mix and DJ their "New Sounds" station.

In late 2004, Party Ben created the "Boulevard of Broken Songs" mashup, featuring elements of Green Day's "Boulevard of Broken Dreams", Oasis' "Wonderwall", Travis' "Writing to Reach You", and Eminem's "Sing for the Moment", which itself sampled Aerosmith's "Dream On". A later version replaced the Eminem sample with the Aerosmith sample. The track became his most widely spread work and received worldwide attention, including that of Billie Joe Armstrong, who mentioned in an interview that he thought it was "cool".

"Boulevard of Broken Songs" was the impetus for Party Ben to work with Team9 on the American Edit album under the alias AJ Music, where the two mashed up the songs from Green Day's American Idiot album. He later mashed "Every Breath You Take" by the Police and "Chasing Cars" by Snow Patrol to create "Every Car You Chase", which got the attention of Snow Patrol and appeared at the end of the 2011 romantic comedy Just Go with It, starring Adam Sandler and Jennifer Aniston.

Party Ben was one of the resident DJs at Bootie. One of his earliest works include a mashup of "Ohh La La" by the Wise Guys and "Summer Nights" from Grease.

Other work
Party Ben is a contributing writer for Mother Jones.

References and notes

External links
 Party Ben Information Systems
 Spin.com featuring Party Ben as "Band of the Day"
 San Francisco Chronicle profiles Party Ben and discusses "Boulevard of Broken Songs"
 Los Angeles CityBeat profiles Party Ben, calling him "Mashup Man"

American DJs
American electronic musicians
Living people
Year of birth missing (living people)
People from Gothenburg, Nebraska
Musicians from Nebraska
Electronic dance music DJs
21st-century American musicians
American mashup artists